Pseudodaphnella punctifera is a species of sea snail, a marine gastropod mollusk in the family Raphitomidae.

Description
The length of the shell attains 5 mm.

The ribs are small, narrower than their interstices and number ten to eleven on the body whorl. They are crossed by smaller transverse ridges. The granules of the intersection are light brown, the rest of the shell is cinereous. The sinus is rather large and semicircular. The outer lip is six-toothed within.

Distribution
This marine species occurs from the Gulf of Carpentaria to Queensland, Australia; widely distributed in the Indo-Pacific.

References

 Preston, H.B. (1908b) Description of a new species of Clathurella, probably from Ceylon. Proceedings of the Malacological Society of London, 8, 6.
 Horro J., Gori S., Rosado J. & Rolán E. (2021). Little conoidean shells from Dhofar, Oman, with descriptions of 35 new species. Visaya. suppl. 16: 1-161.

External links
 
 Garrett, A. (1873). Descriptions of new species of marine shells inhabiting the South Sea islands. Proceedings of the Academy of Natural Sciences of Philadelphia. 25: 209-231, plates 2-3
 Melvill J.C. & Standen R. (1896) Notes on a collection of shells from Lifu and Uvea, Loyalty Islands, formed by the Rev. James and Mrs. Hadfield, with list of species. Part II. Journal of Conchology 8: 273-315
 Gastropods.com: Kermia punctifera

punctifera
Gastropods described in 1873